William Scott Goldberg (born December 27, 1966), often known mononymously as Goldberg, is an American part-time professional wrestler and former American football defensive tackle. He is best known for his tenures in WCW and WWE.

One of the most popular figures of the professional wrestling boom during the late 1990s and early 2000s, Goldberg is widely regarded as one of the most intense wrestlers of all time. He is credited with inventing the spear signature move in wrestling, which he popularized, and for which he gained a reputation for being the best at executing the move. He rose to fame in WCW with a lengthy undefeated streak in singles competition from 1997 to 1998, became the highest paid WCW wrestler, and led the company as its franchise player and public face until it was sold to WWE. During his time with WCW, he became a one-time WCW World Heavyweight Champion, two-time WCW United States Heavyweight Champion, and one-time WCW World Tag Team Champion (with Bret Hart). Along with Hart, he is the fifth WCW Triple Crown winner.

Following WCW's closure in 2001, Goldberg wrestled for AJPW between 2002 and 2003 and for WWE between 2003 and 2004, becoming a one-time World Heavyweight Champion in the latter. After 12 years away from wrestling, he returned to WWE in 2016, winning the WWE Universal Championship for the first time in 2017 and a second time in 2020. He has headlined multiple WCW and WWE pay-per-view events, including WCW's premier annual event Starrcade (in 1998 and 1999). He headlined the WWE Hall of Fame in 2018 and is a five-time world champion in his career between WWE and WCW, with WWE counting his world title win at the 1999 Halloween Havoc. He is also the only man in history to have been the WCW World Heavyweight Champion, WWE World Heavyweight Champion, and WWE Universal Champion.

Before he became a professional wrestler, Goldberg was a professional American football player. Following his first retirement from wrestling in 2004, he began working as a commentator for the MMA promotion Elite Xtreme Combat before it closed down. He hosted 26 episodes of Garage Mahal on the DIY Network from 2009 to 2011 and has acted in various films and television shows, including Universal Soldier: The Return and NCIS: Los Angeles.

Early life 
William Scott Goldberg was born into a Reform Jewish family in Tulsa, Oklahoma, on December 27, 1966, the son of classical violinist Ethel and OB-GYN Jed Goldberg. He is of Russian-Jewish and Romanian-Jewish descent, with his Romanian great-grandfather having relocated to the U.S. from Bucharest through Ellis Island. His father was a graduate of both Harvard and Johns Hopkins University. His parents later divorced, and his father died in late 2006. His mother breeds flowers and created an award-winning hybrid orchid in 2000, which she named after Goldberg. His brother, Michael, later became the owner of a music club in Aspen, Colorado. Goldberg had his bar mitzvah at Temple Israel in Tulsa, and attended Tulsa Edison High School. He acquired a love for football early in his life and, due to his large stature, began working as a nightclub bouncer at the age of 16.

Football career 
Goldberg earned a scholarship to attend the University of Georgia and play college football for the Georgia Bulldogs as a defensive tackle. He was taken by the Los Angeles Rams in the 11th round of the 1990 NFL draft, with the 301st overall selection. He played for the Los Angeles Rams in the 1990 NFL season, followed by a stint with the Sacramento Gold Miners of the Canadian Football League in 1992 and the Atlanta Falcons from 1992 to 1994, where he became close with Deion Sanders. He was cut from the Falcons in 1995, so he was selected by the new expansion team the Carolina Panthers in the 1995 NFL expansion draft. He never played a game with the team, as he was the first player to have been cut by the Panthers.

Goldberg's NFL career ended when he "tore his lower abdomen off his pelvis". He explained that he hoped to return to the league after rehabilitation but was not considered a major asset due to his lack of success. The NFL was "a mixed emotional experience" for him because he did not attain the level of success on the field that he desired, despite reaching the goal of simply playing in the league.

Professional wrestling career

World Championship Wrestling (1996–2001)

Training and matches (1996–1997) 
During his after-NFL rehab, Goldberg began powerlifting and mixed martial arts training when he was spotted by Lex Luger and Sting; both convinced him to try professional wrestling. He was not a fan of professional wrestling. Seeing it as an alternative to his fledgling football career, he began training at the WCW Power Plant.

Goldberg made five appearances, working as Bill Gold during this career. The first match was in a Monday Nitro dark match on June 23, 1997, defeating Buddy Lee Parker. He also faced and defeated Buddy Landell, Hugh Morrus, Chip Minton, and John Betcha. His final pre-televised appearance was in a dark match at a Saturday Night taping on July 24 when losing to Chad Fortune.

Undefeated streak (1997–1998) 

On the September 22, 1997, episode of Nitro, Goldberg defeated Hugh Morrus in his debut match. Soon afterward, he began to score quick victories over his fellow WCW wrestlers in a range of 1–2 minutes. Goldberg had a succession of wins, and he advanced up the card and was pushed as a singles wrestler. The newcomer captivated fans with his monstrous yet silent charisma, brute strength, and agility, and he vaulted the ropes, performed high kicks, and performed the occasional backflip. Goldberg made his first pay-per-view appearance at Halloween Havoc by helping Alex Wright defeat Steve McMichael and then received McMichael's Super Bowl XX championship ring from McMichael's wife Debra. Goldberg proceeded to attack Wright with it. Goldberg's attack on McMichael led to a match between the two in Goldberg's first pay-per-view match at Starrcade, which Goldberg won. 

In early 1998, Goldberg squashed Brad Armstrong at SuperBrawl VIII and pinned Perry Saturn at Spring Stampede. By mid-March, WCW stopped referring to him by his full name, shortening it to simply Goldberg. WCW also began counting Goldberg's consecutive wins on television at about this time, and he continued to climb up the ranks. Goldberg's win over Saturn was his 74th consecutive without a loss. The next night on Nitro, he challenged Raven for the United States Heavyweight Championship that Raven had won the night before at Spring Stampede. Goldberg interfered from Raven's Flock; ironically, however, he overpowered them all and defeated Raven to win his first professional wrestling championship. Two days later, on the April 22 episode of Thunder, he made his first successful title defense against Mike Enos. Goldberg then started a feud with Raven and his Flock. At Slamboree, he ended his feud with The Flock, after a successful title defense against Saturn. Goldberg continued to make successful title defenses against Konnan at The Great American Bash and Curt Hennig. By then, he adopted the catchphrase "Who's next?", in reference to his rapidly expanding winning streak.

Goldberg was getting over as a main eventer, and he continued to defend the United States Heavyweight Championship and slowly became a contender for the WCW World Heavyweight Championship that was held by New World Order (nWo) leader Hollywood Hulk Hogan. Hogan eventually accepted a title match with Goldberg. It was scheduled for the July 6, 1998, episode of Nitro held at the Georgia Dome in Atlanta with over 40,000 in attendance, but Hogan insisted that Goldberg first had to defeat his nWo stablemate Scott Hall. Goldberg won and also able to defeat Hogan later in the evening to become the WCW World Heavyweight Champion, in turn vacating his United States Heavyweight Championship. At Road Wild, Goldberg won a battle royal, consisting of nWo members. After Diamond Dallas Page became the number one contender for the WCW World Heavyweight Championship, Goldberg and Page began a feud with each other. At Halloween Havoc, Goldberg and Page ended the feud when the guy retained the title.  Goldberg states that his match against Page was his favorite match. Goldberg rose to fame with this undefeated streak; however, at Starrcade, he lost the title to Kevin Nash after 175 days as the champion and the official count of 173–0 ended, as Scott Hall disguised as a ringside security guard made a run-in and shocked Goldberg with a taser gun. Goldberg got his revenge at Souled Out, when he defeated Hall in a ladder taser match. Goldberg won when he used the taser which was hung high above the ring, requiring the ladder to obtain it.

Goldberg's win–loss record at WCW events from 1997 to 1998 differed from that which was perpetuated by the company, with the official figure exaggerating the number of matches in which he won to 173. Nick Schwartz of Fox Sports wrote that "No one really knows what Goldberg's actual record was... but it's generally accepted that 173–0 is an inflated number." Some of Goldberg's industry peers have stated that the figure was exaggerated. His then-WCW colleague Chris Jericho stated that "One week he'd be 42–0 and seven days later he'd be 58–0. Did stepping on bugs count?". Manager Jimmy Hart–who also worked with Goldberg in WCW–regarded a "kind of funny" level of embellishment, while professional wrestler The Miz said "The number would just go on and on and on, to where it was like, 'Wait a second. How did he get this many wins in such a short time'?". This exaggeration damaged the streak's credibility among the WCW audience–upon noticing that the figure had been falsified, fans made a withdrawal of homemade signs trumpeting Goldberg's record.

Championship pursuits and final feuds (1999–2002) 

At Spring Stampede, Goldberg gained his revenge against Nash by defeating him. Then at Slamboree the following month, Goldberg was "injured" in an attack by Rick and Scott Steiner and took some time off to prepare for his film debut in the 1999 film Universal Soldier: The Return alongside Jean-Claude Van Damme. He returned two months later and defeated Rick Steiner at Road Wild. Goldberg then restarted his feud with DDP also involving Page's allies, The Jersey Triad, which culminated in a match at Fall Brawl that Goldberg won. After Goldberg settled his rivalry
with Page, he began focusing on Sid Vicious and challenged him to a match to end Sid's winning streak. The two feuded with each other, which culminated in a match at Halloween Havoc for Sid's United States Heavyweight title. Goldberg defeated Sid via referee stoppage and thus won his second United States Heavyweight Championship. Later that night, he answered an open challenge from WCW World Heavyweight Champion Sting and defeated him to win the championship. On the next night's episode of Nitro, commissioner J. J. Dillon ruled that the match had not been sanctioned by WCW and that, therefore, Goldberg's victory was void. Sting, however, was not given the title back due to his attack on a referee during the event and Dillon announced a 32-man tournament for the now vacant title which included Goldberg.

Later that night, Goldberg wrestled against and lost to Bret Hart on the same Nitro in the first round of the tournament in a match that also served as the first defense of his newly won United States Heavyweight Championship. Sid Vicious and The Outsiders managed to interfere in the contest and cost Goldberg the title match, thus giving him his second career loss, and eliminating him from the tournament which was eventually won by Hart at Mayhem in November. Goldberg continued his rivalry with Vicious and defeated him in an "I quit" match at Mayhem to close their feud. Shortly thereafter, Goldberg joined forces with Hart, teaming with him to defeat Creative Control for the WCW World Tag Team Championship. One week later, they lost the title to The Outsiders (Scott Hall and Kevin Nash).

At Starrcade, Goldberg challenged Hart for the WCW World Heavyweight Championship; in the course of the match, Goldberg delivered a stiff kick to Hart's head, legitimately giving him a concussion and tearing a muscle in his neck. Hart continued on, suffering what he believed to be at least one other concussion when he hit his head on the floor while executing a ringpost-assisted figure-four leglock. The match ended when Roddy Piper, the special guest referee for the contest, declared Hart the winner despite Goldberg never having submitted to the Sharpshooter. Hart vacated the title the next night on Nitro, saying he did not want to win that way and gave Goldberg a rematch. Goldberg was defeated again due to outside interference from Hall and Nash, who came to the ring brandishing baseball bats which they used to attack Goldberg. In a swerve, Hart took one of the bats from The Outsiders and began beating on Goldberg himself, doing enough damage to score the pin and regain his championship. After the match, Hall, Nash, Hart and Jeff Jarrett reformed the nWo and gave Goldberg a new target for a feud that, however, would not last long.

Shortly after his title match loss, Goldberg injured himself on the December 23, 1999 episode of Thunder, during a sequence where he chased the nWo limousine into the parking lot. A spot in the sequence called for Goldberg to pound on the windshield of the limousine with his hands. To ensure his safety, Goldberg had assistance from a piece of metal pipe and his hands were covered in black tape. After this, Goldberg was to break some of the vehicle's windows with the pipe. There were four windows on the side of the limousine and Goldberg used the pipe on two of them. He then got aggressive, dropping the pipe and putting his forearm through the third window. A shard of glass sliced an artery in his arm and he began bleeding profusely. The show concluded with Goldberg pounding on the limousine's hood, with the television audience able to see the massive amount of blood gushing from his arm as it covered the hood. Immediately after the cameras stopped rolling, medical personnel rushed in to assist the injured Goldberg, who was eventually transported to the hospital for emergency surgery. He lost copious amounts of blood due to the injury and was told that his injury nearly resulted in the amputation of his forearm. The injury caused Goldberg to miss the January 4, 2000 New Japan Pro-Wrestling (NJPW) Tokyo Dome show, where he was scheduled to face Manabu Nakanishi. After taking time off to recuperate, Goldberg returned to WCW on the May 29, 2000 episode of Nitro interfering in a handicap match between Kevin Nash and the team of Tank Abbott and Rick Steiner. At The Great American Bash, Goldberg betrayed Nash during Nash's world championship match against Jeff Jarrett and turned into a villain for the first time in his career, aligning himself with The New Blood faction. This did not last long, as Goldberg again was lost to injury and had to miss time. As a result of this betrayal, Goldberg feuded with Nash and defeated him at Bash at the Beach, with help from fellow New Blood member Scott Steiner. Goldberg participated in a triangle number one contender's match against Nash and Steiner at New Blood Rising, which Nash won. Goldberg walked out of the match midway through while Nash had him ready for the Jackknife Powerbomb and swore at Vince Russo as he left the ring, turning face again. He then began a rivalry with Steiner, culminating in a no disqualification match at Fall Brawl which Goldberg lost due to outside interference.

After his loss to Steiner, Goldberg's rivalry with Russo accelerated and in October, having finally had enough, Russo gave Goldberg an ultimatum. If Goldberg was to lose another match at any point in time, unless he managed to duplicate his undefeated streak from 1997 to 1998, he would be forced to retire from professional wrestling. Goldberg defeated KroniK (Brian Adams and Bryan Clark) at Halloween Havoc in a handicap elimination match. He then started a feud with Lex Luger. This culminated in a match at Mayhem, which Goldberg won. They continued their rivalry and battled in a rematch at Starrcade. Goldberg won the match, but afterwards he was attacked by Luger's partner Buff Bagwell. Goldberg feuded with both Luger and Bagwell, who called themselves "Totally Buffed". His streak was broken at Sin when Goldberg, teaming with his Power Plant trainer DeWayne Bruce, lost to Totally Buffed in a tag team no disqualification match after a "fan" maced him, enabling Totally Buffed to pin him. The storyline was intended to enable Goldberg to have shoulder surgery, but WCW was sold to the WWF in March 2001, while Goldberg was still recuperating. The WWF did not buy out Goldberg's contract with AOL Time Warner (the parent company of WCW) as they had done with several other WCW wrestlers, due to Goldberg still being paid out a significant amount of money by AOL Time Warner that he was owed, so he was not involved in the WWF "Invasion" angle. Goldberg instead remained under contract to AOL Time Warner until May 2002, when he agreed on a contract buyout. He was WCW's highest paid athlete, alongside Bret Hart, earning $2.5 million per year, a sum which would have risen to $3.5 million in the final year of his contract, due to have expired in July 2003.

All Japan Pro Wrestling (2002–2003) 
Goldberg had suffered an arm injury during the Toyota Pro/Celebrity Race at the Long Beach Grand Prix in April 2002. In August 2002, he returned to the ring in Japan. He initially joined All Japan Pro Wrestling (AJPW), defeating Satoshi Kojima and Taiyō Kea. He went on to defeat Rick Steiner in a match for the W-1 promotion and teamed with Keiji Mutoh to defeat KroniK. His success in Japan led to the WWF – now renamed World Wrestling Entertainment – to begin contract negotiations with him.

World Wrestling Entertainment (2003–2004)

World Heavyweight Champion and departure (2003-2004) 
After leaving Japan, Goldberg signed a one-year contract with World Wrestling Entertainment (WWE) in March 2003, debuting on the March 31 episode of Raw (the night after WrestleMania XIX) and starting a feud with The Rock by performing a spear on him. Their rivalry intensified when The Rock held a segment entitled The Rock Concert, where he taunted Goldberg along with Gillberg, but Goldberg defeated The Rock in his debut match at Backlash on April 27, following three spears and a Jackhammer. Goldberg went undefeated over the subsequent half-year, defeating 3-Minute Warning in his first match on Raw on May 5. Goldberg defeated Christian the following week on Raw in a steel cage match. Goldberg next began a feud with Chris Jericho, culminating in a match between the two at Bad Blood on June 15, which Goldberg won.

Goldberg entered a rivalry with Triple H, challenging him for the World Heavyweight Championship at SummerSlam on August 24 in the second Elimination Chamber match in WWE. After eliminating Randy Orton, Shawn Michaels and Chris Jericho, he was pinned by Triple H after Ric Flair threw a sledgehammer inside the chamber and Triple H hit Goldberg with it, meaning Triple H retained the title. Goldberg continued his feud with Triple H and defeated him for the World Heavyweight Championship at Unforgiven on September 21, after agreeing to put his career on the line. The next night on Raw, Goldberg retained the title against Chris Jericho. The following week on Raw, Triple H issued a $100,000 bounty to anybody who could take Goldberg out. Steven Richards, Mark Henry, La Résistance and Tommy Dreamer all attempted to collect the bounty, but they were unsuccessful. On the October 20 episode of Raw, Batista collected the bounty after he interfered in Goldberg's title defense against Shawn Michaels and attacked Goldberg, placing a folding chair around Goldberg's ankle and jumping off the middle rope onto the chair, shattering his ankle. Furious, Goldberg demanded a match against Batista, but Triple H got involved in the match by trying to cripple Goldberg, who executed a spear on Triple H and attacked Batista with a sledgehammer. At Survivor Series on November 16, Goldberg retained the title against Triple H despite interference from Evolution. On the November 17 episode of Raw, Goldberg faced Triple H, Randy Orton and Batista in a handicap match, but he was pinned following an RKO, Batista Bomb and Pedigree. After the match, Kane unexpectedly came out to seemingly assist Goldberg after Evolution continued their assault on him following the match. After scaring off Evolution, he turned on Goldberg and executed a chokeslam on him. The following week on Raw, Kane attacked Goldberg again while he was defending the championship against Triple H in a rematch from Survivor Series and expressed his desire to face Goldberg for the title. Raw general manager Eric Bischoff scheduled Goldberg to defend the championship against both Kane and Triple H in a triple threat match at Armageddon. The following week on Raw, Goldberg teamed with Shawn Michaels and Rob Van Dam to face and defeat Kane, Batista and Orton in a six-man tag team match. On the December 8 episode of Raw, Goldberg faced Kane in a lumberjack match which ended in a disqualification when Evolution and Mark Henry entered the ring and assaulted Goldberg. At Armageddon on December 14, Goldberg lost the World Heavyweight Championship when Triple H pinned him after interference from Evolution and a chokeslam from Kane, thus ending his reign at 84 days.

Survivor Series also marked the first time Goldberg met the WWE Champion Brock Lesnar by interrupting Lesnar after the latter remarked that he could beat anyone in the world. The feud escalated at the 2004 Royal Rumble on January 25, when Goldberg was in the midst of dominating the Royal Rumble match (he eliminated Charlie Haas, Billy Gunn and Nunzio) as the 30th entrant until Lesnar interfered in the match and executed an F-5 on Goldberg. Angrily distracted at Lesnar's attack, Goldberg was eliminated by Kurt Angle. Vowing revenge after defeating Mark Henry and Jonathan Coachman in a no disqualification handicap match the following Raw, Goldberg declared Lesnar his next victim. On the February 2 episode of Raw, Goldberg was given a front row ticket to No Way Out by Stone Cold Steve Austin. SmackDown! general manager Paul Heyman appeared the following week on Raw and along with Mr. McMahon attempted to get Goldberg to leave Lesnar alone, but Goldberg executed a spear on Heyman and accidentally executed a spear on Austin when he was aiming for McMahon. Goldberg attended No Way Out as a fan, confronting Lesnar and after several insults by Lesnar, entered the ring and countered an F-5 from Lesnar with a Jackhammer, before being detained and escorted out of the arena by security guards. During the main event between Lesnar and Eddie Guerrero on February 15, Goldberg reemerged from the crowd and cost Lesnar the WWE Championship. Lesnar then demanded a match with Goldberg at WrestleMania XX on March 14, with Austin serving as special guest referee. Fans knew this would be the final WWE match for both Goldberg and Lesnar and thus gave largely negative reactions throughout the performance. Goldberg won the match, causing Lesnar to show Austin and the crowd a middle finger, but he instead received a Stone Cold Stunner in return and as Goldberg celebrated his victory with Austin, he also received a Stone Cold Stunner.

Legends of Wrestling (2015–2016) 
Goldberg made his return to professional wrestling on June 7, 2015, at the Legends of Wrestling show at Citi Field in New York. While he was not scheduled to wrestle at the event, Goldberg came to the aid of Rob Van Dam after his match with Scott Steiner. He performed a spear on Steiner and a Jackhammer on Doc Gallows.

On January 23, 2016, Goldberg made a second return for the Legends of Wrestling event in Miami, where he delivered another spear to Steiner after his match with Chavo Guerrero.

Return to WWE (2016–2022)

Universal Champion and Hall of Fame induction (2016–2020) 
On May 31, 2016, Goldberg was announced as the pre-order bonus for the upcoming WWE 2K17 video game. Throughout the summer, Goldberg and WWE 2K17 cover star and former rival Brock Lesnar traded insults with each other through social media and WWE 2K events such as Gamescom. Goldberg would also appear at the WWE 2K SummerSlam event the weekend before the pay-per-view event took place, fueling speculation he would be appearing at the event to confront Lesnar. This led to Paul Heyman challenging Goldberg to face Lesnar on the October 10 episode of Raw, with Heyman stating that Goldberg was the one blemish on Lesnar's WWE career, as Goldberg had defeated Lesnar at WrestleMania XX in 2004. The following week on Raw, Goldberg returned to WWE for the first time in twelve years, accepting Heyman's challenge. The match took place at Survivor Series, where Goldberg defeated Lesnar in 1 minute and 26 seconds. Months later, Goldberg would participate in the Royal Rumble match on January 29, 2017, where he entered at number 28 and eliminated Lesnar following a brief confrontation and a spear, as well as eliminating Rusev and Luke Harper before being eliminated by The Undertaker.

Lesnar then appeared on the following night's episode of Raw and challenged Goldberg to one final match at WrestleMania 33. Goldberg would go on to accept Lesnar's challenge on the February 6 episode of Raw and, on the same episode, also earned a match against Kevin Owens for the WWE Universal Championship. At Fastlane, Goldberg would defeat Owens for the Universal Championship. This led to a match against Lesnar at WrestleMania where Goldberg put his title on the line. At WrestleMania, Goldberg lost the title to Lesnar in what was also his first clean singles loss in his entire career. Goldberg appeared the following night on Raw Talk (which aired on the WWE Network after the Raw broadcast) to wish the fans farewell, but ultimately did not rule out a return in the future.

On January 15, 2018, ESPN announced that Goldberg would be inducted into the WWE Hall of Fame. This was then confirmed on Raw when it was announced by WWE. On March 25, Paul Heyman was announced to induct Goldberg into the Hall of Fame; the event occurred on April 6. Despite his Hall of Fame induction, Goldberg continued to wrestle for WWE. His next match was against The Undertaker at the Super ShowDown event on June 7, 2019. During the match, Goldberg suffered a concussion a few minutes into the match, which severely affected his performance, botching several moves, including the failed Jackhammer on the Undertaker, until the latter finally won the match. His next match was at SummerSlam, where he defeated Dolph Ziggler.

After six months of inactivity, Goldberg returned to WWE on the February 7, 2020 episode of SmackDown, when he appeared via satellite and challenged "The Fiend" Bray Wyatt to a match for the Universal Championship, which Wyatt accepted, setting up a match between the two for Super ShowDown. At Super ShowDown on February 27, Goldberg defeated The Fiend to win the Universal Championship for the second time, becoming the first wrestler to win a world championship after being inducted into the WWE Hall of Fame. During the following weeks, WWE scheduled a match between Goldberg and Roman Reigns at WrestleMania 36 for the Universal Championship, but after Reigns opted to pull out amid concerns surrounding the COVID-19 pandemic, Goldberg's opponent was changed to Braun Strowman. At WrestleMania, Goldberg lost the Universal Championship to Strowman.

Various championship pursuits (2020–2022) 
After a 9-month hiatus, Goldberg faced Drew McIntyre for the WWE Championship at the Royal Rumble on January 31, 2021, but was unsuccessful in winning the championship. Goldberg returned on the July 19 episode of Raw, its first episode in front of a live audience in over a year, to confront WWE Champion Bobby Lashley, teasing a potential match between the two. On the August 2 episode of Raw, Lashley would accept Goldberg's challenge, making their match at SummerSlam for the WWE Championship, official. At SummerSlam, Goldberg lost due to not being able to continue after incurring a knee injury. When Lashley continued to attack him after the end of the match, Goldberg's son Gage intervened but ended up being attacked himself.

On the August 30 episode of Raw, an interview with Goldberg was shown, during which he revealed needing surgery to his knee and vowed to return to get revenge on Lashley for attacking his son. On the September 27 episode of Raw, he appeared via satellite to again call out Lashley for having attacked his son, vowing that we he would come after Lashley in retaliation. On the October 4 episode of Raw, Goldberg would call out Lashley and in response, Lashley would challenge Goldberg to a no holds barred match at Crown Jewel. At Crown Jewel, Goldberg defeated Lashley to end their feud.

On the February 4 episode of SmackDown, Goldberg would make his return to challenge Universal Champion Roman Reigns to a match at Elimination Chamber, a match 2 years in the making after their match at WrestleMania 36 was called off due to Reigns taking a hiatus. At Elimination Chamber, Goldberg lost to Reigns via technical submission.

Legacy, parodies, and reception
"Stone Cold" Steve Austin described Goldberg as one of the strongest wrestlers in history. Notably, Mark Henrywho himself is regarded as one of the world's strongest menalso described Goldberg as one of the strongest people in wrestling. WWE describes Goldberg as "one of the most dominant Superstars to ever set foot inside the squared circle". WWE Hall of Famer and industry veteran Arn Anderson likened Goldberg's popularity at his late 1990s peak to that of Hulk Hogan, The Rock, and Austin, saying that he "was as hot as anybody has ever been in the history of this business". Diamond Dallas Page and Bobby Lashley also claimed that Goldberg was the most popular wrestler at one point in time. Kevin Owens has said that Goldberg was the "figurehead" and "poster boy" of WCW, while Sports Illustrated noted that he "reached the highest point of popularity in pro wrestling". He has been named as the favorite wrestler of figures such as Big E, Randy Orton, Madcap Moss, and Bron Breakker.

Due to his extremely masculine wrestling character, Goldberg has been credited with battling Jewish stereotypes, especially the "nice Jewish boy" stereotype which sees Jewish men portrayed as weak and effeminate. In 1999, Jewish News of Northern California stated that he had "turned the notion of Jew as victim on its head". He told the publication, "I wanted to give the Jewish public someone to hold onto, someone as a positive role model that didn't go out and cuss, didn't go out and cheat, someone to look up to." In a 2005 interview with the San Diego Jewish Journal, he said, "It's been a blessing to be a role model for those Jewish kids who never had a Jewish sports hero to look up to, especially those who were too young to remember Koufax or aren't into baseball and don't follow the career of Shawn Green. [...] [Being Jewish] doesn't mean I have to read the Torah every day, but hell, I wrestled in front of millions of people and called myself by my real name. That's a testament to myself that I'm proud of."

Goldberg's rapid rise to popularity in WCW led the WWF to parody him during the Attitude Era with longtime jobber Duane Gill being repackaged as Gillberg. Goldberg was initially unhappy with the parody, but later embraced the character and was happy that Gill was able to have a more substantial run during his career. The two would eventually confront each other on Raw in 2003, in which Goldberg quickly dispatched Gillberg.

Trying to replicate WCW's success with Goldberg, WWE began pushing Ryback in 2012 in a similar manner to Goldberg, leading to the portmanteau of "Ryberg" to be devised by fans and commentators for Ryback. In October 2012, after Ryback used Goldberg's Jackhammer move during a match against Kofi Kingston, Goldberg tweeted, "NOW comparisons offend me." Spectators at WWE events had been chanting "Goldberg" during Ryback's matches from 2012, which Ryback said "never bothered [him] because fans were very loyal to Goldberg as Goldberg was the top star at WCW and also had a good run in WWE". In response to Chael Sonnen's confusion about Ryback's appeal in late 2014, former WWE writer Jon Piermarini noted on an episode of Sonnen's podcast that the creative staff were doing "essentially the exact same thing they did with the character when it did not work or catch on the first time" and would only continue to get Goldberg's character over as Ryback. Goldberg would return to WWE around the same time Ryback asked for and was granted his release from the company in 2016.

Many promotions would parody Goldberg's infamous streak, including WWE on multiple occasions, albeit with a losing streak such as with the aforementioned Gillberg as well as Curt Hawkins. In 2014, Ring of Honor started a gimmick for R. D. Evans, where he began gloating about his win streak, which he dubbed the "New Streak", although all of his wins came over jobbers or by disqualification over serious wrestlers like Michael Elgin and Roderick Strong. His streak eventually ended later that year.

Bret Hart has been highly critical of Goldberg's work and said, "His wrestling, his work rate, was 0 out of 10." Goldberg's later career run has also been criticized; former WCW executive Eric Bischoff stated it is due to his lack of in-ring talent, while WWE wrestler Riddle has been critical of Goldberg's Universal Championship run and accused him of steroid use. In response to fans complaining about Goldberg being put over younger talent, Goldberg responded, "They can complain all they want. I was brought in for a reason. I'm a relief pitcher." He reiterated that he is just a performer and does not book the matches.

Other media

Film and television 

Goldberg began acting while working for WCW in 1999. His appearance in Universal Soldier: The Return corresponded with him being featured in the music video. He was a special guest star on Hulk Hogan's Celebrity Championship Wrestling. On the show he showed the contestants his various power moves and also how to hit an opponent with a steel chair. He went on to host three seasons of the Speed Channel show Bullrun.

In 2005, Goldberg also starred in the Happy Madison produced Adam Sandler movie The Longest Yard, as an inmate, along with fellow wrestlers Kevin Nash, The Great Khali and Stone Cold Steve Austin, as well as actors Chris Rock and Burt Reynolds among others. In the same year he was also the host of The History Channel documentary series Auto-Maniac and later starred in the movie Santa's Slay where he plays a homicidal Santa Claus who goes on a killing spree on Christmas. In 2007, Goldberg starred in the thriller/drama film Half Past Dead 2 alongside rapper Kurupt.

In March 2010, Goldberg appeared on the ninth season of Donald Trump's reality series The Celebrity Apprentice and was eliminated in the sixth episode. In 2016, Goldberg starred in the documentary film Nine Legends alongside other notable wrestlers, former boxing star Mike Tyson and UFC fighter Randy Couture.

In 2017, Goldberg made his first appearance in the fifth season of The Goldbergs as Coach Nick Mellor, the brother of recurring character Coach Rick Mellor.

In 2018, Goldberg started hosting a knife-based reality show called Forged in Fire: Knife or Death on the History Channel. He appeared in Season 10 Episode 7 ("One of Us") of NCIS:LA as Special Agent Lance Hamilton.

He also starred in the film American Satan (2017) as the tour manager/bodyguard for a heavy metal band called The Relentless.

On July 17, 2022, Goldberg was the subject of the Biography: WWE Legends.

Video games 
Goldberg is a playable character in numerous video games, including WCW Nitro, WCW/nWo Revenge, WCW/nWo Thunder, WCW Mayhem, WCW Backstage Assault, WWE WrestleMania XIX, WWE Raw 2, WWE SuperCard, WWE Champions, Fire Pro Wrestling, WWE SmackDown! Here Comes the Pain, WWE 2K14, WWE 2K17 (for which he was the pre-order bonus), WWE 2K18, WWE 2K19. WWE 2K20, WWE 2K Battlegrounds and WWE 2K22

Mixed martial arts color commentary 

In August 2002, during his professional wrestling tenure in Japan, Goldberg served as color commentator in mixed martial arts (MMA) promotion Pride Fighting Championship. He also participated in MMA training sessions, though without intention to compete himself. Around this time, Goldberg was challenged by Bob Sapp to either a professional wrestling match or a mixed martial arts fight, but nothing came from it. On July 22, 2006, Goldberg served again as color commentator, this time in World Fighting Alliance (WFA) King of the Streetss pay-per-view in Los Angeles, California. When asked whether he was interested in becoming a mixed martial artist, Goldberg stated, "I'd love to, especially if I was 21 or even 29, but these guys are so far ahead of me in terms of experience. I never say never, though. But I don't see myself stopping my movies, my shows, my commentating, or being a dad to do that". On June 2, 2007, Goldberg also commentated on K-1 Dynamite USA.

Goldberg became a color commentator for the EliteXC organization during their inaugural event. The event, EliteXC Destiny, was broadcast live on Showtime, on February 10, 2007. He continued in this role through all of EliteXC's showcase and combined cards, including Dynamite!! USA, Strikeforce Shamrock vs. Baroni, EliteXC: Renegade and EliteXC: Street Certified, until the organization was defunct in 2008.

Other 
Goldberg sponsored the Monster Jam truck "Goldberg", which was driven by Tom Meents from 2000 to 2001 as part of a deal between WCW and FELD Motorsports. The truck was very successful winning the Monster Jam World Finals Racing championship in both 2000 and 2001 and the Freestyle championship in 2001. The partnership ended after WCW was bought by WWE and the truck was renamed to "Team Meents" which later became "Maximum Destruction".

In November 2000, Goldberg and his brother Steve co-authored Goldberg's autobiography I'm Next: The Strange Journey of America's Most Unlikely Superhero.

In 2014, Goldberg started his own podcast entitled Who's Next?! With Bill Goldberg, which includes weekly guest interviews.

Personal life 

Goldberg has been noted for being open about his Jewish background, which was uncommon in the professional wrestling world, especially during his prime. He famously refused to wrestle on Yom Kippur. He celebrates the Jewish holidays but has downplayed the religious aspects of his Jewish background, admitting in 2005 that he is "so far from religious it's not even funny". Despite this, he added, "I guarantee when my girlfriend and I get married, I'll have a rabbi marry us and I'll be breaking the glass right next to her."

On April 10, 2005, Goldberg married Wanda Ferraton, a stunt double he had met while filming Santa's Slay. From 2001 to 2019, they lived in Bonsall, California, before moving to Boerne, Texas. Their son, Gage, was born in 2006.

Goldberg co-owns and operates the Extreme Power Gym Muay Thai and amateur boxing training facility in Oceanside, California. He also owns over 25 vintage cars, including a Plymouth Barracuda, AC Cobra, and Boss 429 Mustang.

Goldberg owned one of the biggest MMA gyms in the world during the early 90s where he trained MMA with the likes of Mark Coleman, Randy Couture, Kevin Randleman, and Don Frye, among others, but after realizing how much money they made in MMA, he chose to follow a pro-wrestling career. He still actively practices Muay Thai and holds the rank of black belt in jiu-jitsu.

Goldberg has a long scar on the right side of his torso from a tear suffered during a college football game that had required surgery to repair. He also acquired a scar on his right forearm from an altercation in WCW, which kept him out of action for an extended amount of time due to the surgery needed to fix it. He has a large tribal tattoo on his left shoulder, which became his professional wrestling logo, and a skull tattoo on the inside of his right biceps.

Charity work 
In January 2016, Goldberg and entertainment impresario Uncle Louie started a joint venture with disabled Air Force veteran Reinaldo Horday called Combat Crate, which offers a crate of exclusive memorabilia with 100% of the profits from its inaugural crate going to the to Wounded Warriors' South Florida branch.

A long-time animal welfare advocate and an American Society for the Prevention of Cruelty to Animals (ASPCA) spokesman, Goldberg addressed Congress in 1999 to raise awareness of illegal animal fighting.

Goldberg regularly participated in the now-defunct Jimmy V Golf Classic, a golf tournament with the profits going towards cancer research, and often visits children in hospitals who are undergoing cancer treatment.

Filmography

Championships and accomplishments 
 Pro Wrestling Illustrated
 Comeback of the Year (2016)
 Inspirational Wrestler of the Year (1998)
 Rookie of the Year (1998)
 Ranked No. 2 of the top 500 singles wrestlers in the PWI 500 in 1998
 Ranked No. 9 of the top 500 singles wrestlers of the PWI Years in 1999
 Ranked No. 39 of the top 500 singles wrestlers of the PWI Years in 2003
 Rolling Stone
 Ranked No. 5 of the 10 best WWE wrestlers of 2016
World Championship Wrestling
 WCW World Heavyweight Championship (1 time)
 WCW United States Heavyweight Championship (2 times)
 WCW World Tag Team Championship (1 time) – with Bret Hart
 Fifth WCW Triple Crown Champion
 Wrestling Observer Newsletter
 Rookie of the Year (1998)
WWE/World Wrestling Entertainment
 World Heavyweight Championship (1 time)
WWE Universal Championship (2 times)
WWE Hall of Fame (Class of 2018)

See also 
 List of multi-sport athletes
 List of Jewish football players
 List of Jewish professional wrestlers

References 

Other sources
 Goldberg, Bill and Goldberg, Steve (2000) I'm Next: The Strange Journey of America's Most Unlikely Superhero, .

External links 

 
 
 
 

1966 births
20th-century professional wrestlers
21st-century professional wrestlers
American car collectors
American color commentators
American football defensive tackles
American football linebackers
American male film actors
American male professional wrestlers
American male television actors
American memoirists
American people of Romanian-Jewish descent
American people of Russian-Jewish descent
American podcasters
American television hosts
Atlanta Falcons players
Carolina Panthers players
Georgia Bulldogs football players
Jewish American sportspeople
Jewish professional wrestlers
Living people
Los Angeles Rams players
Mixed martial arts broadcasters
NWA/WCW/WWE United States Heavyweight Champions
Participants in American reality television series
Players of American football from Oklahoma
Professional wrestlers from California
Professional wrestlers from Oklahoma
Professional wrestling podcasters
Sacramento Surge players
Sportspeople from Atlanta
Sportspeople from Tulsa, Oklahoma
Sportspeople from Oceanside, California
The Apprentice (franchise) contestants
WCW World Heavyweight Champions
World Heavyweight Champions (WWE)
WWE Universal Champions
WWE Hall of Fame inductees
WCW World Tag Team Champions